Faris Arapović (1970 – 18 September 2019) was a Bosnian drummer. He was widely known as a drummer of Sarajevo-based rock bands Zabranjeno Pušenje and Sikter. Also, he was a founder of Sikter.

Career 
Arapović joined a Sarajevo-based rock band Zabranjeno Pušenje in 1986, after their drummer Predrag Rakić left. As a drummer, he performed on their two studio albums: Pozdrav iz zemlje Safari (1987) and Male priče o velikoj ljubavi (1989). In early 1990, he left the band with some other members.

In 1990, Arapović founded Sarajevo-based alternative rock band Sikter. Arapović performed on their first two studio albums: Now, Always, Never (2000) and Queen of the Disco (2002). In 2003, he parted ways with the band.

Arapović died on 18 September 2019.

Discography 

Sikter
 Now, Always, Never (2000)
 Queen of the Disco (2002)

Zabranjeno pušenje
 Pozdrav iz zemlje Safari (1987)
 Male priče o velikoj ljubavi (1989)

References

External links
 Discography at Discogs

1970 births
2019 deaths
Alternative rock drummers
Punk rock drummers
Musicians from Sarajevo
Bosnia and Herzegovina musicians
Zabranjeno pušenje members
Yugoslav musicians
Date of birth missing